Christ the King is a title of Jesus in Christianity referring to the idea of the Kingdom of God where the Christ is described as seated at the right hand of God. 

Many Christian denominations consider the kingly office of Christ to be one of the threefold offices: Christ is a prophet, priest, and king.

The title "Christ the King" is also frequently used as a name for churches, schools, seminaries, hospitals, and religious institutes.

According to a tradition followed most prominently by the Catholic Church, Mary is given the title of Queen of Heaven.

Biblical basis
In the Gospel of Luke, the angel Gabriel proclaims to Mary, "Behold, you will conceive in your womb and bear a son, and you shall name him Jesus. He will be great and will be called Son of the Most High, and the Lord God will give him the throne of David his father, and he will rule over the house of Jacob forever, and of his kingdom there will be no end."

Outside of the gospels, the First Epistle to Timothy (6:14–15) explicitly applies the phrase of "king of kings and lord of lords" (Βασιλεὺς βασιλέων καὶ κύριος κυρίων), adapting the Pentateuch's declaration, for the Lord your God is the God of gods and the Lord of lords, to Jesus Christ. In the Book of Revelation it is declared that the Lamb is "King of kings, and Lord of lords".

Background
The concept of Christ as king was the subject of an address given by Eusebius about AD 314. Depictions of the imperial Christ arise in the later part of the fourth century.

Pius XI

Ubi arcano Dei consilio
Pope Pius XI's first encyclical was Ubi arcano Dei consilio of December 1922. Writing in the aftermath of World War I, Pius noted that while there had been a cessation of hostilities, there was no true peace. He deplored the rise of class divisions and unbridled nationalism, and held that true peace can only be found under the Kingship of Christ as "Prince of Peace". "For Jesus Christ reigns over the minds of individuals by his teachings, in their hearts by His love, in each one's life by the living according to His law and the imitating of His example."

Quas primas  
Christ's kingship was addressed again in the encyclical Quas primas of Pope Pius XI, published in 1925. Michael D. Greaney called it "possibly one of the most misunderstood and ignored encyclicals of all time."  The pontiff's encyclical quotes with approval Cyril of Alexandria, noting that Jesus's kingship was given to him by the Father, and was not obtained by violence: "'Christ,' he says, 'has dominion over all creatures, a dominion not seized by violence nor usurped, but his by essence and by nature.'" He also referenced Leo XIII's 1899 Annum sacrum wherein Leo relates the Kingship of Christ to devotion to his Sacred Heart.

Early Propagation
In November 1926, the Pontiff gave his assent to the establishment of the first church dedicated to Christ under the title of King. The Church of Our Lord, Christ the King, a promising young parish in the neighborhood of Mount Lookout, Cincinnati, which had previously been operating out of a pharmacy located in the neighborhood square, soon began to flourish. In May 1927, a proper sanctuary and neighborhood icon was consecrated. Designed by famed church architect Edward J. Schulte, the building exemplifies the designer's signature marriage of art deco decoration in Brutalist construction, principally arranged to mimic Ancient liturgical spaces of early Christianity.

The hymn "To Jesus Christ Our Sovereign King", was written by Msgr. Martin B. Hellrigel in 1941 to the tune "Ich Glaub An Gott".

Feast of Christ the King

The Feast of Christ the King was instituted by Pope Pius XI in 1925. The General Roman Calendar of 1969 moved its observance in the Roman Rite to the last Sunday of Ordinary Time, the final Sunday of the liturgical year. Most Anglicans, Lutherans and some Protestants celebrate it on the same day. However, Catholics who observe the pre-Vatican II General Roman Calendar of 1960, and members of the Anglican Catholic Church celebrate it instead on the last Sunday of October, the Sunday before All Saints' Day, the day assigned in 1925.

Things named after Christ the King

See also
 Jesus is Lord
 Christ Pantocrator—a specific depiction of Christ, especially in Orthodox Christianity
 Cristo Rei, the Portuguese translation used for several place names
 Cristo Rey, the Spanish translation used for several place names
, theocratic slogan
 Feast of Christ the King
 The Kingdom of God and the Kingdom of Heaven are theological concepts interpreted variously
 Kingly office of Christ, one of the Threefold offices
 Cornelius Lucey, Christus Rex Society, 1941
 Peter McKevitt, Christus Rex Society, 1941
 Ubi arcano Dei consilio
 Throne of God
 Symbolism of domes

References

External links

 

 
Christian terminology
Christology